Andrew Hore (born 1978) is a former New Zealand rugby union player.

Andrew Hore may also refer to:
 Andrew Hore (cricketer) (born 1969), New Zealand cricketer
 Andrew Hore (rugby union administrator) (born 1972), New Zealand rugby union administrator